Timothy J. Leiweke (born April 21, 1957) is an American sports executive who is the chief executive officer of the Oak View Group. Leiweke was the former president and CEO of Maple Leaf Sports & Entertainment (MLSE) and former President and CEO of Anschutz Entertainment Group (AEG). Leiweke held roughly a 4% stake in AEG as of 2012, and is well known for his relationship with notoriously reclusive AEG founder and Denver-based billionaire Philip Anschutz, whom he has known since the early 1990s. Since November 2015, Leiweke has served as the CEO of the Oak View Group, "a global advisory, development and investment company for the sports and live entertainment industries".

Anschutz Entertainment Group
Leiweke was President and CEO of Anschutz Entertainment Group (AEG), which owns the Los Angeles Kings, the Los Angeles Galaxy, part of the Los Angeles Lakers, the L.A. Live entertainment complex, as well as multiple sporting and entertainment venues around the world, such as the StubHub Center and the O2 Arena in London, which it manages. In September 2012 it was announced that AEG would be put up for sale. A deal for the privately owned group, reportedly worth up to $10 billion, was expected to be announced sometime in the first half of 2013. On March 14, 2013 Anschutz announced that AEG was no longer for sale. In an interview, Anschutz stated that he had recently become "reengaged" in the business and also suggested the company had failed to receive bids nearing the $8 to $10 billion asking price.

On the same day it was announced the sale had been called off, it was announced Leiweke would be replaced as President and CEO by AEG executive Dan Beckerman, who previously has served as both chief operating officer and chief financial officer. The change in leadership was attributed by some analysts as a reaction to the failure AEG experienced in attracting serious bidders during the sale process and its inability securing an NFL occupant for the Farmers Field, a proposed stadium next to L.A. Live.

Maple Leafs Sports and Entertainment
Leiweke became President and CEO of MLSE on April 26, 2013. MLSE, which is  75%  owned by Rogers Communications and Bell Canada include properties like the Toronto Maple Leafs of the NHL, the Toronto Raptors of the NBA and Major League Soccer team Toronto FC, as well as multiple sport and residential properties such as Scotiabank Arena, Ricoh Coliseum, and Maple Leaf Square. During his tenure, Leiweke assumed residence in Toronto, Ontario, Canada. He was integral in the signings of Toronto FC designated players Michael Bradley, Jermain Defoe, and Sebastian Giovinco, as well as the hiring of Maple Leafs president Brendan Shanahan and Toronto Raptors president Masai Ujiri.

On August 21, 2014, Leiweke announced that he would be leaving MLSE and would remain in his role until June 30, 2015 or until MLSE had named his successor. Leiweke ultimately left MLSE on October 29, 2015 after the appointment of Michael Friisdahl as his successor.

Oak View Group
On November 16, 2015, Leiweke & his business partner, Irving Azoff, founded the Oak View Group (OVG), a Los Angeles-based "global advisory, development and investment company for the sports and live entertainment industries". Leiweke serves as OVG's CEO.

On December 4, 2017, the Seattle City Council voted 7–1 to approve a memorandum of understanding with the Oak View Group, for renovations of KeyArena. Renovations for the arena began in 2018 and will be fully completed in 2021.

On December 7, the NHL's board of governors agreed to consider an application for an expansion team from Seattle, the Seattle Kraken, with an expansion fee set at $650 million. The Seattle ownership group is represented by David Bonderman and Jerry Bruckheimer. On February 20, Mayor Jenny Durkan launched an NHL campaign during her State of the City and announced that the Oak View Group would be initiating a season ticket drive on March 1, 2018. On December 4, 2018, the National Hockey League announced that the league would expand to Seattle in 2021 with the approval of the group's bid.

Personal life
Leiweke is married to Bernadette. They have one daughter, Francesca, who is married to Troy Bodie, a pro hockey scout and former player in the Toronto Maple Leafs organization. As of 2016, Francesca serves as vice president of business development for her father's company, the Oak View Group.

Tim's younger brother, Tod Leiweke, is currently the chief executive officer and president of the Seattle Kraken of the National Hockey League, and formerly the chief operating officer of the National Football League between 2015 and 2018.

References

1957 births
Living people
American chief executives of professional sports organizations
American expatriates in Canada
Los Angeles Kings executives
Major League Soccer executives
Businesspeople from Los Angeles
Businesspeople from St. Louis
Maple Leaf Sports & Entertainment
Toronto Maple Leafs executives
Toronto Raptors executives